Mego (ΜΕΓΚΟ) was a Greek light vehicle manufacturer, based in Trikala. Its first products, launched in 1947, were utility tricycles. In 1951, it began manufacturing motorized utility tricycles with 50–100cc engines and an unconventional design in which the solo wheel was located at the rear.

About
The company's first products were branded Nigo, a named derived from that of its founder, Nikos Gorgolis. In 1962, it was partly sold to MEBEA and was renamed Mego (from MEBEA and Gorgolis); the change in ownership was accompanied by the introduction of conventional light three-wheel trucks. In 1967, the Gorgolis family regained total ownership of the company but retained the Mego name. Mego subsequently designed and built a large number of 50cc moped and motorcycle types and light 50cc three-wheel trucks, using mainly Sachs engines, as well as bicycles. A 125cc motorcycle was launched in  1968. Mego's moped and motorcycle models, featuring innovative designs, included the 50S series, the EK, the Libra, the Viva and the particularly novel GP50 Carrera.

Mego's products were fairly popular in Greece, where the company's customers included the police, the  Hellenic Post and the Hellenic Telecommunications Organization. Mego also exported its products, especially to the Netherlands. The company faced problems in the late 1980s, mainly due to competition by second-hand imports. Motorcycle production ceased in 1988 but the company remained in operation until 1992, servicing its products with parts, etc. Subsequently, it was renamed Gorgolis S.A., focusing on motorcycle import and distribution.

Nipponia
Since 1992 the company also branched in a new venture, creating subsidiaries in Japan, the Dominican Republic, Venezuela, and China, marketing and selling motorcycles. The brand Nipponia was established (as a reference to Japanese-style excellence) for a series of Greek-designed, Chinese-built motorcycles sold in several countries. A world headquarters of Nipponia was subsequently established in Athens responsible for design, engineering, marketing and quality control for motorcycles built in Shanghai, China. Its latest range is designed by Sotiris Kovos (designer of the Toyota Yaris and other Toyota models) and currently marketed in Europe.

Gallery

References 
L.S. Skartsis, "Encyclopedia of Greek vehicles and aircraft", Achaikes Ekdoseis/Typorama, Patras, Greece (1995) 
L.S. Skartsis, "Greek Vehicle & Machine Manufacturers 1800 to present: A Pictorial History", Marathon (2012)  (eBook)
Ch. Kylafis-Kelafis, "I Istoria tis Mego (History of Mego)", Kradasmoi magazine, July 2010 issue, p. 16
M. Arvanitopoulos, "Istoria tou Ellinikou Motosykletismou (History of the Motorcycle in Greece)", Mototech, Athens (2006) 
"Scooter me Elliniki Ypografi (Scooter with a Greek Signature)" article in K magazine (Kathimerini newspaper), February 14, 2010

External links 
Nipponia website
Gorgolis S.A. website
Kradasmoi, July 2010 issue

Companies based in Trikala
Moped manufacturers
Motorcycle manufacturers of Greece
Greek brands